Kakula is a small uninhabited islet in Shefa Province of Vanuatu in the Pacific Ocean. The island is a tourist destination.

Geography
Kakula lies between the north-east shore of Efate Island and Pele Island.

References

Islands of Vanuatu
Shefa Province
Uninhabited islands of Vanuatu